James Williams Riddleberger (September 21, 1904 – October 17, 1982) was an American diplomat and career foreign service officer. During his career, he served three ambassadorships: in Austria, Yugoslavia and Greece.

Biography

Early life and education
Riddleberger was born in Washington D.C. on September 21, 1904. He earned a B.A, from Randolph-Macon College in 1924 and MA in Foreign Service from Georgetown University in 1926. He also attended American University from 1926–27 and was an assistant professor for international relations at Georgetown University from 1926 to 1929. Before joining the Foreign Service in 1929, he worked for the Library of Congress and Tariff Commission.

Career
Riddleberger began his foreign service career in Geneva, where he served as Vice Consul and later as Consul at the League of Nations and Berlin as Third Secretary(1936–37) and Second Secretary(1937–41). He served as chief of the Central European Affairs division during the Second World War. After the war, he became the chief political adviser to General Lucius D. Clay and later to John J. McCloy in occupied Germany. He was then transferred to Paris in 1950 to serve as a senior political advisor aiding in the administration of the Marshall Plan. He served as director of the Bureau of German Affairs before beginning a four-year term as ambassador to Yugoslavia. After Yugoslavia broke away from the Soviet orbit of influence in 1948, Riddleberger was credited with persuading Josip Broz Tito to rebuff coaxing by Nikita Khrushchev to return. As Ambassador to Greece, he worked to smooth relations between Greece and Turkey in their dispute over Cyprus.

Death
Riddleberger died from heart attack at Shenandoah County Memorial Hospital, at the age of 78. His daughter, Antonia Riddleberger, was married to diplomat Monteagle Stearns (1924–2016), who served as United States Ambassador to Greece from August 1981 through September 1985.

Obituaries
 Chicago Tribune, October 19, 1982.
 Washington Post, October 19, 1982.

References

1904 births
1982 deaths
Ambassadors of the United States to Austria
Ambassadors of the United States to Greece
Ambassadors of the United States to Yugoslavia
United States Career Ambassadors
United States Foreign Service personnel